Murs Rules the World is the third solo album by American hip hop artist Murs. Most of the tracks are produced by Mum's The Word. It was released on October 10, 2000.

Track listing

2000 albums
Murs (rapper) albums